Eurycorymbus cavaleriei is a species of plant in the family Sapindaceae and the single species in the genus Eurycorymbus. It is found in China and Taiwan, where it is threatened by habitat loss.

References

Flora of China
Flora of Taiwan
Near threatened plants
Monotypic Sapindaceae genera
Taxonomy articles created by Polbot
Dodonaeoideae
Taxa named by Heinrich von Handel-Mazzetti